An Ethernet virtual connection or  Ethernet virtual circuit (EVC) defines a data link layer bridging architecture that supports Ethernet services. An EVC is defined by the Metro-Ethernet Forum (MEF) as an association between two or more user network interfaces that identifies a point-to-point or multipoint-to-multipoint path within the service provider network. An EVC is a conceptual service pipe within the service provider network. A bridge domain is a local broadcast domain that exists separately from VLANs.

References

External links
 Ethernet Virtual Connection (EVC), Metro-Ethernet Forum wiki

Ethernet